Latinisation or Latinization can refer to:
 Latinisation of names, the practice of rendering a non-Latin name in a Latin style
 Latinisation in the Soviet Union, the campaign in the USSR during the 1920s and 1930s to replace traditional writing systems for numerous languages with the Latin alphabet
 Liturgical Latinisation, the adoption of practices from Latin Christianity by the non-Latin Christians
 Re-latinization of Romanian, process by which the Latin features of the Romanian language were strengthened
 Latinism, a word, idiom, or structure derived from, or suggestive of, the Latin language; an aspect of Latinisation
 Romanization, the conversion of writing from a different writing system to the Roman (Latin) script
 Romanization of Arabic
 Romanization of Armenian
 Romanisation of Bengali
 Romanization of Burmese
 Romanization of Chinese
 Romanization of Cyrillic
 Romanization of Devanagari
 Romanization of Georgian
 Romanization of Greek
 Romanization of Hindi-Urdu (Hindustani)
 Romanization of Japanese
 Romanization of Khmer
 Romanization of Korean
 Romanization of Lao
 Romanization of Malayalam
 Romanization of Persian
 Romanisation of Sindhi
 Romanization of Telugu
 Romanization of Thai
 Romanization of Urdu-Hindi

 Romanization (cultural), the acculturation, integration, assimilation, of newly incorporated and peripheral populations by the Roman Republic and Roman Empire

See also
 Latin (disambiguation)
 List of Latinised names
 Binomial nomenclature a formal system of naming species of living things by giving each a name composed of two parts, both of which use Latin grammatical forms
 Romanization (disambiguation)
Transliteration or transcription into the Latin alphabet